"Landslide of Love" was the third single to be taken from English pop rock band Transvision Vamp's second album, Velveteen (1989). It was a top-20 UK hit in 1989, spending five weeks on the UK Singles Chart and peaking at number 14.

Critical reception
A Smash Hits reviewer gave a mostly positive review on this single, saying that Wendy James' voice reminds her of the early works of Cyndi Lauper but noting that the track lacks "the grab" of "Baby I Don't Care".

Track listings
7-inch and cassette single
 "Landslide of Love"
 "Hardtime" (Anthony Doughty)
 "He's the Only One for Me" (Dave Parsons)
 A limited-edition 7-inch picture disc was also released.

12-inch single
A1. "Landslide of Love" (extended)
A2. "W11 Blues"
B1. "Hardtime"
B2. "He's the Only One for Me"
 A limited edition 12-inch gatefold sleeve version was also released.

CD single
 "Landslide of Love" (7-inch version) – 3:50
 "W11 Blues" – 4:51
 "Hardtime" – 3:37
 "He's the Only One for Me" – 3:32

Charts

References

External links
 http://www.itm-ed.de/tvamp/music/discography/landslideoflove.html Worldwide releases

Transvision Vamp songs
1989 singles
1989 songs
MCA Records singles